Minted is an online marketplace of premium design goods created by independent artists and designers. The company sources art and design from a community of more than 16,000 independent artists from around the world. Minted offers artists two business models for selling their goods - one in which Minted handles manufacturing and fulfillment and a second where the artists handles manufacturing and fulfillment.

History
Minted was founded in April 2007 by Mariam Naficy to sell high-end lines of stationery and adopted a crowdsourcing model when it realized that designs by independent artists were outselling those of established brands. Minted has raised more than $300 million from investors, including T. Rowe Price, Permira, Norwest Venture Partners, Technology Crossover Ventures, Benchmark Capital, Ridge Ventures. Angel investors include former Yahoo CEO Marissa Mayer, Yelp CEO Jeremy Stoppelman, and Eventbrite founders Kevin and Julia Hartz.

In 2012, Minted expanded outside of its core stationery market by launching wall art prints and party decor. 

In 2015, Minted launched home decor. 

In 2017, Minted launched wholesale, with national retail partners including Target, West Elm, and Pottery Barn Kids.

In 2021, Minted introduced Direct From Artist, where artists manufacture and fulfill their own products.

Minted partnered with Every Mother Counts, a maternal health nonprofit organization led by Christy Turlington Burns, in which a part of the proceeds from selling customized children's art would go to benefit the organization.

Crowdsourcing
Minted holds regular design challenges that are open to artists and designers. Thousands of independent artists participate in the challenges. More than 2,000 designs are submitted by artists to Minted every week. 

Visitors to the website vote on the design submissions to help choose the winning designs that will be sold on the website. Minted's predictive voting algorithms use consumer votes to predict which of the thousands of submissions from the contest will be future bestsellers.

Winning artists are paid a cash prize and earn an ongoing commission on sales of their designs.

Awards
In October 2014, Minted was named #5 on LinkedIn's 10 Bay Area startups that are most in demand by local techies.

References

External links 
 http://www.minted.com

Online retailers of the United States
Companies based in San Francisco